John Waight (2 November 1945) is a former sports shooter, who represented Belize at the 1976 Summer Olympics.

Waight competed in the mixed 50 metre free pistol event at the 1976 Summer Olympics in Montreal, and after scoring 419 points he finished in 47th place.

References

1945 births
Living people
Belizean male sport shooters
Olympic shooters of Belize
Shooters at the 1976 Summer Olympics
Place of birth missing (living people)